This list of transgender publications includes books, magazines, and academic journals about transgender people, culture, and thought.

Books
Some publishers of transgender-related books include Trans-Genre Press, Topside Press, and Transgress Press.

Non-fiction
{|class="wikitable sortable"
!width="25%" | Work
!width="7%"  | Year
!width="15%" | Author
!width="48%" | Notes
!width="5%"  | References
|-valign="top"
| Transidentity
| align="center"|2022
| Hans-Werner Gessmann/Vishal Lohchab
| 
|
|-valign="top"
| ACT For Gender Identity: The Comprehensive Guide
| align="center"|2020
| Alex Stitt
| 
|
|-valign="top"
| Gender Outlaw: On Men, Women and the Rest of Us
| align="center"|1994
| 
| 
|
|-valign="top"
|Mom, I Need to be a Girl
| align="center"|1998
| Just Evelyn
| Memoir from the point of view of the mother. 
|
|-valign="top"
|X Marks The Spot: An Anthology Of Nonbinary Experiences
| align="center"|2019
| Theo Hendrie (editor)
| Essays and poetry from nonbinary people for nonbinary people. 
|  
|-valign="top"
|Normal Life: Administrative Violence, Critical Trans Politics and the Limits of Law
| align="center"|2011
| 
| Nominated for a 2011 Lambda Literary Award. 
| 
|-valign="top"
| Raising Ryland
| align="center"|2015
| 
| 
|
|-valign="top"
| Redefining Realness
| align="center"|2014
| 
| Memoir
| 
|-valign="top"
| Third Sex and Human Rights
| align="center"|1999
| 
| 
|
|-valign="top"
| Trans Liberation: Beyond Pink or Blue
| align="center"|1999
| 
| 
|
|-
|Transecology: Transgender Perspectives on Environment and Nature
|2021
|Douglas A. Vakoch (editor)
|
|
|-valign="top"
| Transgender History
| align="center"|2008
| 
| 
| 
|-
|Transgender India: Understanding Third Gender Identities and Experiences
|2022
|Douglas A. Vakoch (editor)
|ISBN 978-3-030-96385-9
|
|-valign="top"
| Transgender Liberation: A Movement Whose Time Has Come
| align="center"|1992
| 
| 
|
|-valign="top"
| Transgender Rights
| align="center"|2006
|  Paisley Currah, Richard M. Juang, and Shannon Minter (editors)
| 
|
|-valign="top"
| Transgender Warriors: Making History from Joan of Arc to Dennis Rodman
| align="center"|1996
| 
| 
|
|-valign="top"
| The Truth about Me: A Hijra Life Story
| align="center"|2009
| Transgender A. Revathi
| 
|First book on Hijra by a Hijra
|-valign="top"
| When Kayla Was Kyle
| align="center"|2013
| 
| 
|
|-valign="top"
| Lou Sullivan: Daring to be a Man Among Men
| align="center"|2017
| 
| 
|
|-valign="top"
| Becoming Eve: My Journey from Ultra-Orthodox Rabbi to Transgender Woman
| align="center"|2019
| 
| 
|First book by Hasidic trans person 
|-
| Amateur| 2018
| 
| 
|
|-
| Man Alive| 2014
| 
| 
|
|-
| Please Miss: A Heartbreaking Work of Staggering Penis| 2022
| 
| 
|
|}

 Fiction and poetry 

Extended list
 Bill's New Frock (1989) by Anne Fine is a children's book for younger readers. Bill wakes up one morning to find he is a girl. Forced off to school in a frilly pink dress, Bill finds that he does not like being treated as a girl.
 The Butterfly and the Flame (2011) by Dana De Young is dystopian novel set in the year 2404 A.D. in a time where technology and society have relapsed and a corrupt and repressive theocracy known as the Dominion of Divinity rules most of what was once the United States. The main protagonist is a male to female transgender teenager by the name of Emily La Rouche who has been living in stealth since the age of six, but is unwittingly forced into an arranged marriage to the son of her landlord when she turns sixteen years old. Much of the story is a backdrop for the American culture wars and incorporates issues such as separation of church and state, GLBT rights, unreasonable search and seizure, invasion of privacy, as well as enhanced interrogation techniques.
 Bye-Bye, Black Sheep: A Mommy-track Mystery (Ayelet Waldman, 2006) is a mystery, part of a series featuring Juliet Appelbaum, a stay-at-home mom and former public defender. In this installment, Appelbaum is approached by Heavenly, a transsexual woman who asks her to investigate the murder of her sister, Violetta, a prostitute and drug addict.
 Cereus Blooms at Night: A Novel (Shani Mootoo, 1999) is a multi-narrative novel set in a fictional island in the Caribbean. An ambiguously gendered, but often presumed male, nurse named Tyler tells the troubled family history of Mala Ramchandin, an elderly woman under her care at a nursing home. Ze also relates the story of the transgender man named Otoh, who becomes Tyler's boyfriend. Shani Mootoo's novel explores identity, gender and community.
 Cock and Bull 1992 novel by Will Self in which a man and a woman develop sexual organs of the opposite sex.
 The Danish Girl (2000) by American author David Ebershoff is a fictionalized account of the life of Lili Elbe, the first person to undergo sex reassignment surgery.
 Sacred Country by Rose Tremain published in 1992 is a prizewinning novel about Mary Ward, who at the age of six decides she should have been born a boy. The novel concerns her struggle in a small town in England.

Magazines and periodicals

Academic journalsBulletin of Applied Transgender Studies (2021–present)International Journal of Transgender Health (1998–present)Transgender Health (2016–present)
 Transgender Studies Quarterly (2014–present)

See also

 List of transgender-related topics
 List of transgender-rights organizations
 List of fictional trans characters
 List of transgender people
 Literature about intersex
 Zenith Foundation Publications

Further reading
 Lannie Rose, How to Change Your Sex: A Lighthearted Look at the Hardest Thing You'll Ever Do, second edition, Lulu.com, 2006.
 Lannie Rose, Lannie! My Journey from Man to Woman, SterlingHouse Publisher, Inc., 2007.
 Peggy J. Rudd, Crossdressing with Dignity: The Case for Transcending Gender Lines, PM Publishers, Inc., 1999. .
 Charles Anders, The Lazy Crossdresser, Greenery Press, 2002. .
 Lacey Leigh, Out & About: The Emancipated Crossdresser, Double Star Press, 2002. .
 Caroline Cossey, My Story, Faber and Faber, reprint edition 1992. .
 Mildred L. Brown and Chloe Ann Rounsley. True Selves: Understanding Transsexualism—For Families, Friends, Coworkers, and Helping Professionals'', Jossey-Bass.

References

External links
 Frock, a bimonthly magazine
 The Gender Society, an online community of transgender people
 TG LIFE, online magazine and community
 TransOhio Publications
 Transgender book list on T-Vox
 'transgender related publications' a list of materials made by a librarian for collection development.

 
Transgender-related lists